Electricity Is on Our Side is a studio album by American rapper Busdriver. It was released on June 8, 2018 by Temporary Whatever. It features guest appearances from Hemlock Ernst, Daedelus, and Denmark Vessey, among others. A music video for "Right Before the Miracle" was released on June 1, 2018.

Critical reception

Tory Rosso of BeatRoute gave the album a favorable review, writing: "Consisting of 23 tracks for an astounding 82 minutes, the record is an eclectic backdrop of resonance and jingle." Will Schube of Bandcamp Daily described it as "an album that's both the best encapsulation of Busdriver's mission and ethos, and a radical rearranging of rap's boundaries."

Track listing

References

External links
 Electricity Is on Our Side at Bandcamp
 

2018 albums
Busdriver albums